Estuardo Maldonado (born 1928) is an Ecuadorian sculptor and painter inspired by the Constructivist movement. Maldonado is a member of VAN, the group of Informalist painters founded by Enrique Tábara.  Other members of VAN included, Aníbal Villacís, Luis Molinari, Hugo Cifuentes, León Ricaurte and Gilberto Almeida.  Maldonado's international presence is largely due to his participation in over a hundred exhibits outside of Ecuador.

Born in Píntag, in the Quito district of Ecuador, Maldonado left home at a young age in order to observe and learn from nature. Both nature and Indigenous themes have been a fundamental inspiration for much of his work.  Maldonado studied art at the School of Fine Arts in Guayaquil.  By 1953, Maldonado was teaching drawing and art history at the American School of Guayaquil.  In 1955, Maldonado traveled the Ecuadorian coast painting the people of the coast and landscapes.

In 1955, Maldonado held his first exhibitions in Guayaquil, Portoviejo, and Esmeraldas.  In 1956, Benjamin Carrion invited Maldonado to exhibit at the House of Ecuadorian Culture making him the first Ecuadorian artist to exhibit sculpture in Quito and Guayaquil.  In 1957, Maldonado set out for Europe on a scholarship and traveled to France, Germany, Switzerland and the Netherlands and settled in Rome, Italy.  Maldonado attended the Academy of Fine Arts of Rome and the Academy of San Giacomo.
  
Maldonado's work depicts abstractions of nature. His ancestral roots are also evident in some of his works based on pre-Columbian imagery from his native Andean zone. At the same time, he is interested in the palpitation of the evolving Universe. It is because of this inherent curiosity with advancement and history that he has a place within the Latin American Constructivist art movement.

Vladimir Tatlin founded Constructivism in Russia in 1913. Influenced by Futurism and Cubism, this movement is based on abstract, geometric forms and is related to architectural ideas. The Constructivist movement made its way into Latin America by way of Joaquín Torres García and Manuel Rendón.  Constructive Universalism is an innovative style created by Joaquín Torres García who after living in Europe for over forty years, returned to his native land, Uruguay and brought with him new artistic concepts. Constructive Universalism combines references to the Pre-Columbian world with the geometric forms of European Constructivism.

Maldonado's work has been celebrated throughout the world for successfully combining nature with innovation while addressing the relationship to his Andean roots.

In 2009, Maldonado was awarded the Premio Eugenio Espejo, his country's most prestigious National Award for Art, Literature and Culture presented by the President of Ecuador.

Museums and exhibitions
 1956 - House of Ecuadorian Culture, Guayaquil, Ecuador
 1964 - Biennial of Venice, Venice, Italy
 1974 - Center for the International Studies of Constructivist Art, Bonn, Germany
 1974 - Marcon IV Gallery, Rome, Italy
 1977 - Abstract Currents in Ecuadorian Art: Paintings by: Gilbert, Rendon, Tábara, Villacís, Molinari and Maldonado. Center for Inter-American Relations, New York, New York, U.S.
 1985 - First Latin American Symposium of Sculpture of Santo Domingo, Dominican Republic
 1985 - Art Museum of the Americas, Organization of American States (OAS), Washington, D.C.
 1986 - Ecuadorian Embassy, Port-au-Prince, Haiti
 1987 - I Biennial International Painting of River Basin, River Basin, Ecuador
 1987 - Museum of Contemporary Hispanic Art (MoCHA), New York
 1988 - XX Biennial of São Paulo, São Paulo, Brazil
 1991 - Masters of Latin America, Nagoya, Japan
 1994 - Gallery of Nadar Art, Dominican Republic
 1998 - Museum of Italian Art, Lima, Peru
 2000 - Pontifica Catholic University of Ecuador
 2000 - Museum of Modern Art, Santiago, Chile
 2000 - Exhibition, Perth, Western Australia
 2001 - Exposición Centro Cultural Metropolitano de Quito, Ecuador.
 2002 - Antología"1945-2002", Pontificia Universidad Católica de Ecuador.
 2002 - Sala Municipal de Exposiciones de Valencia. L'Almudí.Valencia, Spain
 2003 - Museo Luis Gonzalez Robles Alcalá de Henares. Madrid, Spain
 2004 - Banco Central del Ecuador. Quito, Ecuador.
 2004 - Galería Arte Jorge Ontiveros. Madrid, Spain
 2004 - Sala Ayuntamiento L'Olleria. ValenciaSpain
 2005 - Exposición en Chicago. Galería Aldo Castillo.
 2005 - Fundación Jaume II el Just. Real Monasterio Santa Maria Valldigna. Generalitat  Valenciana (Simat de Valldigna).
 2005 - Sala Exposiciones Ayuntamiento de Elche. Alicante. España
 2005 - Aldo Castillo Gallery, Chicago USA
 2006 - The Katzen Art Center at American University, Washington, D.C., USA
 2006 - Sala Autoral, Estuardo Maldonado, Museo Antropologico y de Arte Contemporaneo (MAAC), Guayaquil, Ecuador.
 2007 - Galeria de Arte "CosmoArte Siglo XXV". Alicante, Spain
 2008 - Ministry of Foreign Trade and Integration - Ecuadorian Embassy in Germany, Berlin, Germany.
 2008 - ArtMadrid. Madrid. España
 2008 - Sala de Exposiciones Parque de atracciones "Terra Mitica" . Benidorm. Alicante, Spain
 2008 - Expo Zaragoza 2008. Pabellón de las Artes de Telefónica. Zaragoza, Spain

Sources
 Barnitz, Jacqueline, Twentieth-Century Art of Latin America.  University of Texas Press; Austin, Texas, 2001.
 Salvat, Arte Contemporáneo de Ecuado'''. Salvat Editores Ecuatoriana, S.A., Quito, Ecuador, 1977.
 Sullivan, Edward J.,  Latin American Art in the Twentieth Century''. Phaidon Press Limited; London, 1996.

External links
 Estuardo Maldonado Foundation - https://fundacionestuardomaldonado.blogspot.com/
Museo Antropologico y de Arte Contemporaneo - https://web.archive.org/web/20050306200121/http://www.maac.org.ec/
 https://web.archive.org/web/20060225143626/http://www.mmrree.gov.ec/
 Aldo Castillo Gallery, Chicago, Illinois
 CosmoArte Siglo XXV, Alicante, Spain

Modern painters
Ecuadorian painters
Ecuadorian sculptors
Living people
1928 births
People from Quito Canton
20th-century sculptors